Sunil Kumar is an Indian-born academic administrator. He is the president-elect at Tufts University after serving as provost and senior vice president for academic affairs at Johns Hopkins University.

Early life and education 
Kumar was born in India. He is the son of a police officer. He earned a bachelor of engineering form National Institute of Technology Karnataka in 1990. In 1992, he completed a master of engineering in computer science and automation at the Indian Institute of Science. Kumar received a Ph.D. in electrical engineering from University of Illinois Urbana-Champaign in 1996.

Career 
Kumar worked for 14 years at Stanford Graduate School of Business. He was the Fred H. Merrill Professor of Operations, Information and Technology. He was also a senior associate dean of academic affairs and oversaw the MBA program. Kumar was later the George Pratt Shultz Professor of Operations Management at the University of Chicago Booth School of Business where he also served as the dean since 2011. On September 1, 2016, Kumar became the 15th provost of Johns Hopkins University. On November 17, 2022, Kumar was announced as the 14th president of Tufts University, succeeding Anthony Monaco. He assumes the position on July 1, 2023, becoming the first person of color to hold the position.

References

External links
 

Living people
Year of birth missing (living people)
Place of birth missing (living people)
Indian Institute of Science alumni
Grainger College of Engineering alumni
University of Chicago Booth School of Business faculty
Johns Hopkins University administrators
Indian expatriate academics
Indian expatriates in the United States